Alejandro Asensio Crespillo (born 14 September 2000), commonly known as Vere, is a Spanish footballer who plays as a left winger for Rayo Vallecano B.

Club career
An AD Torrejón CF youth graduate, Vere made his senior debut with the reserve team during the 2019–20 season, in the Preferente de Madrid. He started to feature with the first team in Tercera División in November 2020, being mainly used as a substitute.

Vere moved to Rayo Vallecano on 24 July 2021, being initially assigned to the B-side in Tercera División RFEF. He impressed with the B-team during the first months of 2022, and made his first team – and La Liga – debut on 12 May 2022, replacing Álvaro García late into a 1–5 home loss against Villarreal CF.

References

External links

2000 births
Living people
Footballers from Madrid
Spanish footballers
Association football wingers
La Liga players
Tercera División players
Tercera Federación players
Divisiones Regionales de Fútbol players
Rayo Vallecano B players
Rayo Vallecano players